True Song is Do As Infinity's fourth album. It was released on December 26, 2002 under the Avex Records label. The last song on this album, "Ai no Uta", has become a fan favorite and also a staple song to the end of all the Do As Infinity concerts after this album released. Another staple song for their concerts was "One or Eight", which they usually do band member introductions in the middle of. "Kūsō Ryodan", according to Saiko Kawamura written in the Do the A-side booklet, is the song resembling Do As Infinity spirit. He stated that "...we are the fantasy brigade..." in the last sentence of the booklet which he penned.

Track listing

Chart positions

External links
 True Song at Avex Network
 True Song at Oricon

2002 albums
Do As Infinity albums
Avex Group albums
Albums produced by Seiji Kameda